Kikkas or Kikas is an Estonian surname (meaning rooster), and may refer to:

 Irina Kikkas (born 1984), rhythmic gymnast
 Jaan Kikkas (1892–1944), weightlifter
 Kaupo Kikkas (born 1983), photographer
 Marie Heleen Lisette Kikkas (born 1996), footballer

See also

 Kika
 Kikas
 Kikka

Estonian-language surnames